Ford Park is a 221-acre multi-purpose entertainment complex consisting of an arena, exhibit hall, amphitheater, midway, and 12 youth baseball fields located on I-10 South in Beaumont, Texas. The complex opened in 2003. It is owned by Jefferson County, Texas and operated by OVG360, a division of the Oak View Group. It is the home of the South Texas State Fair. 

In 2020, Jefferson County began negotiations to sell Ford Park to Renaissance Development Group, which would add a hotel and a horse-racing track to the complex. The deal fell through in 2022 after Renaissance failed to put additional earnest money towards the $22 million sale price.

The Southeast Texas Ford Dealers have held the naming rights to the complex since 2003, a deal which will expire at the end of 2022.

Facilities
 Ford Arena seats 9,737 people. The arena hosts concerts, rodeos, circuses, motorsports, ice shows and many other special events. It was also the former home to several professional teams including the Oxford City FC of Texas (formerly the Texas Strikers) of the Major Arena Soccer League, the Southeast Texas Mavericks ABA franchise, Beaumont Drillers of the NIFL, and the Texas Wildcatters of the ECHL, and the Beaumont Panthers of The Basketball League. 
 Ford Exhibit Hall is a multi-purpose hall for exhibits, trade shows, and more. It has  of space. The hall includes a 48,000 sq ft dedicated exhibit floor, an 11,000 sq ft lobby/pre-convention space, 8 meeting rooms, 6 loading bays, concession stands, and restrooms.
 Ford Fields are 12 youth softball/baseball fields. The infields are all-weather synthetic turf. Each field has covered seating with protective netting. Also included are 1,000 onsite parking spots, concession stands, and restrooms.
 Ford Midway is a  midway for fairs, carnivals, and other large outdoor events. The midway includes two free-span livestock show barns. 
 Ford Pavilion is an outdoor amphitheater, seats 14,000 people. The pavilion includes 2 star dressing rooms, 2 supporting act dressing rooms, 3 production offices, 7 loading bays, a catering/crew room, parking, restrooms, and concessions.

See also
Beaumont Civic Center
Fair Park Coliseum
Ford Arena
List of contemporary amphitheatres
Montagne Center

References

External links
 Official website
 

Convention centers in Texas
Indoor arenas in Texas
Indoor ice hockey venues in the United States
Sports venues in Beaumont, Texas
Tourist attractions in Beaumont, Texas
Softball
2003 establishments in Texas
Sports venues completed in 2003
Fairgrounds in the United States